The Amazon class was a class of six screw sloops of wooden construction built for the Royal Navy between 1865 and 1866.

Construction

Design
Designed by Edward Reed, the Royal Navy Director of Naval Construction, they were equipped with a ram bow. The hull was of wooden construction, but they were the first class of sloops to incorporate a form of composite construction; they had iron cross beams while retaining wooden framing.

Propulsion
Propulsion was provided by a two-cylinder horizontal single-expansion steam engine by Ravenhill, Salkeld & Company driving a single  screw. Vestal and Nymphe were fitted with three-cylinder Maudslay engines.

Sail plan
All the ships of the class were built with a barque rig.

Armament
The class was designed with two 7-inch (6½-ton) muzzle-loading rifled guns mounted on slides on centre-line pivots, and two 64-pounder muzzle-loading rifled guns on broadside trucks. Dryad, Nymphe and Vestal were rearmed in the early 1870s with an armament of nine 64-pounder muzzle-loading rifled guns, four each side and a centre-line pivot mount at the bow.

Ships

Notes

Bibliography

 

 
Ship classes of the Royal Navy
Sloop classes
 Amazon